Roquetoire is a commune in the Pas-de-Calais department in the Hauts-de-France region of France.

Geography
Roquetoire is located some 7 miles (12 km) southeast of Saint-Omer at the junction of the D195 and the D187 roads.

Population

Places of interest
 The church of St.Michel, dating from the nineteenth century.
 The eighteenth century Château de La Morande.

See also
Communes of the Pas-de-Calais department

References

External links

 Official website 
 Internet website : villagederoquetoire.free.fr 

Communes of Pas-de-Calais